Curreya is a genus of fungi in the family Cucurbitariaceae.

The genus name of Curreya is in honour of Frederick Currey (1819 - 1881), a British botanist and Secretary of the Linnean Society between 1860 - 1880.

The genus was circumscribed by Pier Andrea Saccardo in Syll. Fung. Vol.2 on page 651 in 1883.

References

External links
Index Fungorum

Pleosporales